Allium archeotrichon is a species of onion endemic to the east Aegean islands – Rhodes, Tilos and Symi. It is a bulb-forming perennial with a scent resembling that of onions or garlic. It produces an umbel of flowers.

References

archeotrichon
Onions
Flora of the East Aegean Islands
Plants described in 1999
Rhodes